Travis Williams (born January 20, 1983) is an American football coach and a former American football linebacker of the National Football League. Williams is the defensive coordinator at Arkansas.

High school career
Williams played at Spring Valley High School.

Coaching career
Following his playing career, Williams returned to the Auburn Tigers as a graduate assistant under head coach Gene Chizik in 2009. Chizik was Auburn's defensive coordinator during Williams' collegiate career. Following the 2011 season, Williams left Auburn to coach Northern Iowa as the Linebackers coach. Williams was defensive coordinator at Creekside High School for the 2013 season before returning to Auburn in 2014 as a defensive analyst. Williams was promoted to Auburn's linebacker coach following the 2015 season.

On February 17, 2021 Williams reunited with Gus Malzahn to serve as the defensive coordinator at UCF.

In December 2022, Williams was announced as the new defensive coordinator at Arkansas, replacing the departing Barry Odom.

Music career
Williams is also a musician and rapper. He has released many demos and songs including the unofficial pump up song of the Auburn Football team, "Tiger Walk"

External links

External links
Auburn Tigers bio

1983 births
Living people
Sportspeople from Columbia, South Carolina
Players of American football from Columbia, South Carolina
American football linebackers
Auburn Tigers football players
Atlanta Falcons players